Major depressive disorder 2 is a protein that in humans is encoded by the MDD2 gene.

References